Anna Sophia Folch (born August 18, 1985) is a Brazilian actress. She has played the lead role in two telenovelas and plays the lead role in a television series.

Biography 
Anna Sophia Folch was born in Rio de Janeiro, and she married Ângelo Paes Leme in Petrópolis on September 6, 2008.

Career 
She started her career playing Flora, who was the mother of the character played by José Wilker, in the 2006 movie O Maior Amor do Mundo, directed by Cacá Diegues. Anna Sophia Folch played the lead role, Teresa Dias, in the same year in the telenovela Paixões Proibidas, co-produced by Rede Bandeirantes from Brazil and RTP from Portugal, and set in those countries in the 19th Century.

The actress played one of the lead roles in the 2008 Rede Globo's telenovela, Ciranda de Pedra. Anna Sophia Folch played the moralist Bruna Prado, who is one of the three daughters of the characters played by Ana Paula Arósio and Daniel Dantas, and despite being married, is attracted to the lawyer Rogério, played by Cláudio Fontana, who works in her father's law firm. She participated in the 2008 indie film Apenas o Fim, playing Cris, and guest starred in two Multishow television series, in 2010 in Vendemos Cadeiras as Adriana, and in 2011 in Adorável Psicose as Carla Brown, before being cast as the lead role Nina in the 2011 television series Cara Metade, also produced by Multishow. She portrays Heloísa in the 2012 telenovela Lado a Lado.

Filmography

Film

Television

References

External links 
 

Living people
1985 births
Actresses from Rio de Janeiro (city)
Brazilian television actresses
Brazilian telenovela actresses